The 1926 Georgia gubernatorial election took place on November 2, 1926, in order to elect the Governor of Georgia.

Incumbent Democratic Governor Clifford Walker was term-limited, and ineligible to run for a third term.

As was common at the time, the Democratic candidate ran unopposed in the general election so therefore the Democratic primary was the real contest, and winning the primary was considered tantamount to election.

Democratic primary
The Democratic primary election was held on September 8, 1926. As no candidate won a majority of county unit votes, a run-off was held between the top two candidates on October 6, 1926.

County unit system
From 1917 until 1962, the Democratic Party in the U.S. state of Georgia used a voting system called the county unit system to determine victors in statewide primary elections.

The system was ostensibly designed to function similarly to the Electoral College, but in practice the large ratio of unit votes for small, rural counties to unit votes for more populous urban areas provided outsized political influence to the smaller counties.

Under the county unit system, the 159 counties in Georgia were divided by population into three categories. The largest eight counties were classified as "Urban", the next-largest 30 counties were classified as "Town", and the remaining 121 counties were classified as "Rural". Urban counties were given 6 unit votes, Town counties were given 4 unit votes, and Rural counties were given 2 unit votes, for a total of 410 available unit votes. Each county's unit votes were awarded on a winner-take-all basis.

Candidates were required to obtain a majority of unit votes (not necessarily a majority of the popular vote), or 206 total unit votes, to win the election. If no candidate received a majority in the initial primary, a runoff election was held between the top two candidates to determine a winner.

Candidates
George H. Carswell
Lamartine Griffin Hardman, former State Senator and unsuccessful candidate for Democratic nomination for Governor in 1914 and 1916
John N. Holder, chairman of the State Highway Commission
Joe O. Wood, former state legislator

Results

Although Holder won a plurality of the popular vote in the first round, Hardman won a plurality of county unit votes. No candidate winning a majority of county unit votes in the first round, the election went to a run-off.

General election
In the general election, Hardman ran unopposed.

Results

References

Notes

Bibliography
 
 

1926
Georgia
Gubernatorial
November 1926 events